The 2004 Individual Long Track/Grasstrack World Championship was the 34th edition of the FIM speedway Individual Long Track World Championship.

The world title was won by Gerd Riss of Germany for the fifth time.

Venues

Final Classification

References 

2004
Speedway competitions in France
Speedway competitions in Germany 
Speedway competitions in New Zealand 
Long
Long
Long
Long